Kalyung Ke Avtaar is a 1995 Hindi-language drama film, produced by Sarla A. Saraogi under the Vikas Productions banner and directed by Shyam Ralhan. It stars Jeetendra, Reena Roy, Dharamjeet, Madhoo in the pivotal roles and music composed by Ravindra Jain.

Plot 
Ailing multi-millionaire Pratap promises that he will marry the first woman he sees the next morning. The first woman he sees is Reena, who comes from a poor family. Pratap proposes to her dad and introduces Reena to his mom. The marriage is celebrated with great pomp and ceremony. Years later a son, Shyam, is born to them. When Shyam grows up, he attends college and falls in love with fellow-collegian, Babli. When Pratap finds out that his son is in love, he meets and accepts Babli as his daughter-in-law right away. The only problem is Babli's brother, Dhamu Dada, who hates all millionaires, and is all set to oppose this marriage – tooth and nail.

Cast 
 Jeetendra as Pratap
 Reena Roy as Reena
 Dharamjeet as Shyam
 Madhoo as Babli
 Kiran Kumar as Dhamu Dada
 Jagdeep as Sukhiram
 Goga Kapoor as Goga
 Arjun as Vicky
 Aruna Irani as Pratap's Mother

Soundtrack

External links 

1990s Hindi-language films
1995 films